is a passenger railway station located in  Midori-ku in the city of Sagamihara, Kanagawa Prefecture, Japan, and is operated by the East Japan Railway Company (JR East).

Lines

Station layout
The station consists of a single island platform serving two tracks, connected to the station building by a footbridge. The station is staffed

Platforms

History
Fujino Station first opened on July 15, 1901, as a passenger station on the Japanese Government Railways (JGR) Chūō Line. The JGR became the JNR after the end of World War II. With the dissolution and privatization of the JNR on April 1, 1987, the station came under the control of the East Japan Railway Company. Automated turnstiles using the Suica IC Card system came into operation from November 18, 2001.

Passenger statistics
In fiscal 2019, the station was used by an average of 2,151 passengers daily (boarding passengers only).

The passenger figures (boarding passengers only) for previous years are as shown below.

Surrounding area
former Fujino Town Hall
 Lake Sagami

See also
List of railway stations in Japan

References

External links

Official home page. 

Railway stations in Kanagawa Prefecture
Railway stations in Japan opened in 1943
Chūō Main Line
Stations of East Japan Railway Company
Railway stations in Sagamihara